One of the Baes (International title: My Crown Princess) is a Philippine television drama romance comedy series broadcast by GMA Network. Directed by King Mark Baco and Michael Christian Cardoz, it stars Ken Chan in the title role and Rita Daniela. It premiered on September 30, 2019 on the network's Telebabad line up replacing The Better Woman. The series concluded on January 31, 2020 with a total of 90 episodes. It was replaced by Love of My Life in its timeslot.

The series is streaming online on YouTube.

Premise
Jowalyn Biglangdapa is willing to do anything to become a ship captain including sidelining her love life. One day, she will meet Grant Altamirano, whom will find out that Jowalyn is the one he's looking for.

Cast and characters

Lead cast
 Ken Chan as Grant Altamirano
 Rita Daniela as Jowalyn "Jowa" Biglangdapa / Princess Aragoza

Supporting cast
 Roderick Paulate as Paps Fernando Biglangdapa / Victoria
 Amy Austria as Josephine "Jo" Rubio / Josephine De La Cruz-Aragoza
 Melanie Marquez as Alona Aragoza
 Tonton Gutierrez as Francis Aragoza
 Jestoni Alarcon as Steve Altamirano
 Archie Alemania as Efren "Bagets" Reynes
 Kenneth Medrano as Gary Balencia
 James Teng as Amador "Amay" Amador
 Edgar Allan Guzman as Charles Altamirano
 Rodjun Cruz as Martin Rivera
 Joyce Ching as Xtina Aguilar
 Maureen Larrazabal as Carmina Rivera-Biglangdapa
 Buboy Villar as Okoy McCormick
 Jelai Andres as Dorina "Dorie" Quirino
 Mahal as Queen Floribeth Higantes
 Dyosa Pockoh as Dyosa
 Inday Garutay as Inday 
 Joel Palencia as Manalo
 Renz Lagria as Atienza

Guest cast
 Elle Ramirez as young Jo Rubio
 Joemarie Nielsen as young Francis Aragoza
 Pauline Mendoza as Kimmy Santisimo
 Lovely Abella as a mad woman
 Gene Padilla as Commandant
 Andre Paras as New Tenant
 Manel Sevidal as Ketchup Girl
 Carlos Agassi as Carpenter
 Odette Khan as Adoracion "Ador" Santisimo
 Wilma Doesnt as Rosalinda
 Yasser Marta as young Steve
 Dani Porter as Bridgette Montenegro
 Addy Raj as Carlos Falcon
 Ruby Rodriguez as Madel Mendoza
 Lexi Gonzales as Izza Mendoza
 Michelle Dee as young Alona Aragoza
 Euwenn Aleta as Jun-Jun
 Rez Cortez as Rolando Salazar
 Archie Adamos as Philip Ortiz
 Nico Antonio as Benjie Reynes
 Gee Canlas as Blessie Reynes
 Kisses Delavin as Queenie
 Dentrix Ponce as teen Jun-Jun
 Jon Gutierrez as Jong

Accolades

References

External links
 
 

2019 Philippine television series debuts
2020 Philippine television series endings
Filipino-language television shows
GMA Network drama series
GMA Integrated News and Public Affairs shows
Philippine romantic comedy television series
Television shows set in the Philippines